Huddleston is an unincorporated community in Bedford County, Virginia, United States,   south-southeast of Bedford. Huddleston has a post office with ZIP code 24104, which opened on August 28, 1909. Huddleston Elementary School is located in the community.

Climate
The climate in this area is characterized by hot, humid summers and generally mild to cool winters.  According to the Köppen Climate Classification system, Huddleston has a humid subtropical climate, abbreviated "Cfa" on climate maps.

References

Unincorporated communities in Bedford County, Virginia
Unincorporated communities in Virginia